"Everlovin'" is a song written by Dave Burgess and first recorded by the Australian vocal trio, The Crescents, who released the song in 1959.

Rick Nelson recording
Ricky Nelson toured Australia soon after and The Crescents were one of the support acts. Ricky liked the song and later recorded it.
Nelson's version of the song reached #16 on the Billboard Hot 100 and #23 in the UK in 1961.

Other versions
Robin Luke released a version as the B-side to his 1960 single "Well Oh, Well Oh".
The song's writer, Dave Burgess, recorded a version of the song that was released on the 2003 album, The Lost '60s Recordings.

References

1960 songs
1960 singles
1961 singles
Ricky Nelson songs
Imperial Records singles